Santiago Alejandro Segura (born July 3, 1988) is an American actor. He is best known for his portrayal of Gustavo Acosta in the second season of the MTV slasher series Scream.

Life and career
Segura was born on July 3, 1988 in Washington, D.C. He is of Colombian heritage. In 2013, he made his acting debut in the 2013 crime thriller film, 5th Street. Following on from his first role, Segura won other roles on a variety of TV shows including The Middle, Silicon Valley and Faking It. In 2015, Segura was cast as Benjamin in the underwater survival thriller film 47 Meters Down which was released in theaters on June 16, 2017.

In 2016, Segura was cast in the series regular role of Gustavo Acosta on the second season of MTV's Scream.

Filmography

Film

Television

References

External links
 

1992 births
Living people
Male actors from Washington, D.C.
American people of Colombian descent
American male film actors
American male television actors
American male models
Hispanic and Latino American male actors
21st-century American male actors